The 1921 Toronto Argonauts season was the 35th season for the team since the franchise's inception in 1873. The team finished in first place in the Interprovincial Rugby Football Union with a perfect 6–0 record and qualified for the playoffs for the second consecutive season. The Argonauts defeated the defending champion Toronto Varsity Blues in the Eastern Semi-Final before winning the Eastern Final over the Toronto Parkdale Canoe Club. The Argonauts faced the Edmonton Eskimos in the 9th Grey Cup game, which was the first time that a Western Canada Rugby Football Union team competed for the Cup. The Argonauts completed their first and only perfect season and won the franchise's second Grey Cup championship by a score of 23-0 in the first ever shut out in a Grey Cup game.

Regular season

Standings

Schedule

Postseason

Grey Cup

December 3 @ Varsity Stadium (Attendance: 9,558)

References

Toronto Argonauts seasons
Grey Cup championship seasons